Eva Leanza Cornett (June 10, 1971 – October 28, 2020) was an American television personality and beauty pageant titleholder.  She was crowned Miss Florida 1992 and Miss America 1993 the same year.

Early life
Cornett was born in Big Stone Gap, Virginia, and was a 1989 graduate of Terry Parker High School. She was inducted into the school's Hall of Fame in 2006.

Pageantry
Cornett was previously National Sweetheart 1991. As Miss America 1993, she became the first Miss America to adopt AIDS awareness as her platform for her year of service. She became one of the first Miss America titleholders to refuse to wear the Miss America crown at public appearances.

Career
Cornett was the first actress to play a live-action version of Ariel, the title character from The Little Mermaid, at the "Voyage of The Little Mermaid" show at Disney's Hollywood Studios at Walt Disney World Resort in 1991.  She was also a member of the contemporary Christian music group Area Code, which released their single album, One Big World, before Leanza’s big break.

Cornett also served as a host for several television shows, including  Entertainment Tonight (1994–1995), New Attitudes (1998), and Who Wants to Marry a Multi-Millionaire? (2000).  She made television guest appearances in television series such as Melrose Place, The Tick, CSI, and Saved by the Bell, and Fear Factor.  In addition, she served as a reporter for Animal Planet's coverage of the Eukanuba AKC National Dog Show programs, and hosted the "On The Block" show on DIY Network.

Her stage credits included Barefoot in the Park, Godspell, The Best Little Whorehouse in Texas, Bye Bye Birdie, and Voyage of the Little Mermaid.

Personal life
Cornett married broadcast journalist Mark Steines on July 22, 1995.  Weeks after their wedding, Cornett was let go from her Entertainment Tonight position and immediately replaced by Steines himself.  Cornett and Steines had two sons, Kai Harper (born on February 19, 2002), and Avery James (born on November 4, 2003). The couple later divorced after 17 years of marriage.  She died on October 28, 2020, after being hospitalized for a head injury incurred in a fall at her home in Jacksonville, Florida.

References

External links

 
 Delta Delta Delta Distinguished Alumnae profile

1971 births
American infotainers
American women television personalities
Miss America 1993 delegates
Miss America winners
People from Big Stone Gap, Virginia
People from Jacksonville, Florida
Rollins College alumni
2020 deaths
Accidental deaths from falls
Accidental deaths in Florida
Deaths from head injury
20th-century American people
Television personalities from Florida